Margaret of L'Aigle (died 1141) was Queen of Navarre as the first wife to García Ramírez of Navarre. She was the daughter of Gilbert of L'Aigle and Juliana du Perche, daughter of Geoffrey II, Count of Perche.

Life
Though daughter of the Anglo-Norman lord of L'Aigle, she had connections with the region where she would marry.  Her maternal grandmother, Beatrice of Montdidier, was sister of Felicia, Queen of Navarre and Aragon.  Her uncle, Rotrou III, Count of Perche, had fled Normandy in despair after a family tragedy, the loss of his wife, son, and two nephews, Margaret's brothers Engenulf and Geoffrey of L'Aigle, in the 1120 wreck of the White Ship.  Leaving Margaret's mother Juliana in charge of his County of Perche, Rotrou returned to Aragon, where he had earlier spent time fighting, and while there this second time he arranged Margaret's marriage.

Marriage and children
Margaret was married in 1130 to a royal scion, García Ramírez, lord of Monzón, four years before his unexpected election to the throne of Navarre. He confirmed the rights and privileges of the church of Pamplona on the advice of "uxoris mee Margarite regina" by charter dated 1135.  

Margaret was to bear García:
 Sancho VI
 Blanca, born after 1133, married Sancho III of Castile
 Margaret, named after her mother, married William I of Sicily

Garcia's relationship with Margaret was, however, unstable. She supposedly  took many lovers and showed favouritism to her French relatives. She bore a second son named Rodrigo, whom her husband refused to recognise as his own. He was never acknowledged as a son by the Navarrese king, even after Margaret's death, and he was widely considered a bastard, though his sister Margaret did not treat him as such. He certainly never behaved as anything other than the son of a king.

Margaret died on May 25, 1141. Later deceased, she still recalled her for years in several documents. 

Her husband later remarried, yet her younger daughter remembered her fondly.

References

Sources
 
 
 

Year of birth unknown
1141 deaths
12th-century nobility from the Kingdom of Navarre
12th-century Spanish women
House of Jiménez
Navarrese royal consorts